Ingrid Schjelderup (born 11 May 1932) is a Norwegian politician for the Centre Party.

She served as a deputy representative to the Norwegian Parliament from Rogaland during the terms 1977–1981 and 1981–1985. In total she met during 5 days of parliamentary session.

References

1932 births
Living people
Deputy members of the Storting
Centre Party (Norway) politicians
Rogaland politicians
Place of birth missing (living people)
20th-century Norwegian women politicians
20th-century Norwegian politicians
Women members of the Storting